Communauté d'agglomération Grand Lac is the communauté d'agglomération, an intercommunal structure, centred on the town of Aix-les-Bains. It is located in the Savoie department, in the Auvergne-Rhône-Alpes region, southeastern France. Created in 2017, its seat is in Aix-les-Bains. The name Grand Lac refers to the Lac du Bourget. Its area is 300.0 km2. Its population was 76,759 in 2019, of which 30,463 in Aix-les-Bains proper.

Composition
The communauté d'agglomération consists of the following 28 communes:

Aix-les-Bains
La Biolle
Bourdeau
Le Bourget-du-Lac
Brison-Saint-Innocent
Chanaz
La Chapelle-du-Mont-du-Chat
Chindrieux
Conjux
Drumettaz-Clarafond
Entrelacs
Grésy-sur-Aix
Méry
Montcel
Motz
Mouxy
Ontex
Pugny-Chatenod
Ruffieux
Saint-Offenge
Saint-Ours
Saint-Pierre-de-Curtille
Serrières-en-Chautagne
Tresserve
Trévignin
Vions
Viviers-du-Lac
Voglans

References

Grand Lac
Grand Lac